Tony Gayton is an American movie producer and screenwriter.

Early life
Gayton graduated from Merritt Island High School in 1977 in Merritt Island, Florida.
Gayton is also a graduate of the USC School of Cinematic Arts, where he received the Jack Nicholson Writing Scholarship.

Career
After graduating, he worked as a production assistant for John Milius. Gayton has been a professional screenwriter for over ten years, working both by himself and with his brother, Joe Gayton (Uncommon Valor, Shout).

Gayton also directed the critically acclaimed documentary film Athens, GA: Inside/Out, which featured the bands R.E.M. and the B-52's as well as the eccentric folk artist Reverend Howard Finster.

Gayton produced the 2010 action-drama Faster, co-written with his brother Joe, and starring Dwayne Johnson and Billy Bob Thornton.

In 2011, he and brother Joe teamed up again to create a dramatic television series for the cable channel AMC, titled Hell On Wheels, which premiered on November 6. Set in 1865, the series centers on the settlement and its people that accompanied the construction of the first transcontinental railroad, referred to as "Hell on Wheels."

Filmography

Movies

Television

References

External links
 

Year of birth missing (living people)
Living people
American male screenwriters
USC School of Cinematic Arts alumni
American film directors
Place of birth missing (living people)